Lamerdingen is a municipality in the district of Ostallgäu in Bavaria in Germany. The town has a municipal association with Buchloe.

References

Ostallgäu